is a district located in Hyōgo Prefecture, Japan.

As of 2003, the district has an estimated population of 18,014 and a density of 119.87 persons per km2. The total area is 150.28 km2.

Towns and villages
Kamigōri

Districts in Hyōgo Prefecture